Yuriy Mykolayovych Virt (born 4 May 1974 in Lviv, Ukraine) is a retired Ukrainian football goalkeeper and current manager of FC Veres Rivne.

Career
He played over 100 games for Metalurh Donetsk in the Ukrainian Premier League. In the beginning of 1990s he also played for number of clubs from Lviv Oblast such as FC Skala Stryi and the first FC Lviv city team.

In September 2001 he played two games for the Ukraine national football team earning clean sheets wins in both of them against Belarus and Armenia.

After retiring from playing career, Virt worked for Ukrainian Premier League club Metalurh Donetsk as a goalkeeper coach. Since 2017, he coached as a manager FC Veres Rivne and FC Rukh Vynnyky. In June 2019, he was once again appointed as manager of Veres Rivne.

Honours
Veres Rivne
 Ukrainian First League: 2020–21

Individual
 Best Coach round 6 Ukrainian Premier League: 2021–22

References

External links

1974 births
Living people
Sportspeople from Lviv
Ukrainian footballers
Association football goalkeepers
Ukraine international footballers
Ukrainian Premier League players
FC Skala Stryi (1911) players
FC Borysfen Boryspil players
FC Shakhtar Donetsk players
FC Shakhtar-2 Donetsk players
FC Metalurh Donetsk players
FC Metalurh-2 Donetsk players
FC Lviv (1992) players
FC Systema-Boreks Borodianka players
Ukrainian football managers
NK Veres Rivne managers
FC Rukh Lviv managers
Ukrainian Premier League managers
Ukrainian First League managers
Ukrainian Second League managers